Overlook Park may refer to:
Overlook Park (Chino Hills, California)
Overlook Park (Montgomery, Alabama)
Overlook Park (Oviedo, Florida)
Overlook Park (Portland, Oregon)
Overlook Park station, Portland, Oregon